Scott T. Acton is a professor in the Charles L. Brown Electrical and Computer Engineering Department and in the Biomedical Engineering Department of the  University of Virginia School of Engineering and Applied Science, Charlottesville campus. Acton was born in California. He is the director of the  Virginia Image and Video Analysis (VIVA) group there.   He works in the fields of  video tracking and  anisotropic diffusion.

His B.S. degree (1988) is from Virginia Tech, his  M.S.(1990) and Ph.D. (1993) degrees from the University of Texas at Austin, where his advisor was Alan Bovik.
He is a Fellow of the IEEE., and served as Editor-in-Chief of the IEEE Transactions on Image Processing from 2014 to 2017. Acton has been at the University of Virginia since 2000. Before that time, he worked in the academic world for Oklahoma State University and in the engineering world for AT&T, Motorola and the Mitre Corporation.

Publications
He has published over 60 peer-reviewed journal articles, and 90 peer-reviewed conference presentations.

Books
S.T. Acton and N. Ray, Biomedical Image Analysis: Tracking, Morgan and Claypool Publishers, 2006.
S.T. Acton and N. Ray, Biomedical Image Analysis: Segmentation, Morgan and Claypool Publishers, 2009.

References

External links
 

University of Virginia faculty